Johnson v. M'Intosh, 21 U.S. (7 Wheat.) 543 (1823), is a landmark decision of the U.S. Supreme Court that held that private citizens could not purchase lands from Native Americans. As the facts were recited by Chief Justice John Marshall, the successor in interest to a private purchase from the Piankeshaw attempted to maintain an action of ejectment against the holder of a federal land patent.

The case is one of the most influential and well-known decisions of the Marshall Court, a fixture of the first-year curriculum in nearly all U.S. law schools. Marshall's opinion lays down the foundations of the doctrine of aboriginal title in the United States, and the related doctrine of discovery. However, the vast majority of the opinion is dicta; as valid title is a basic element of the cause of action for ejectment, the holding does not extend to the validity of M'Intosh's title, much less the property rights of the Piankeshaw. Thus, all that the opinion holds with respect to aboriginal title is that it is inalienable, a principle that remains well-established law in nearly all common law jurisdictions.

Citation to Johnson has been a staple of federal and state cases related to Native American land title for 200 years. Like Johnson, nearly all of those cases involve land disputes between two non-Native parties, typically one with a chain of title tracing to a federal or state government and the other with a chain of title predating U.S. sovereignty. A similar trend can be seen in the early case law of Australia, Canada, and New Zealand. The first land dispute involving an indigenous party to reach to the Supreme Court was Cherokee Nation v. Georgia (1831).

The ruling essentially enforces the Royal Proclamation of 1763 that was issued by King George III.

Background
Thomas Johnson, one of the first Supreme Court justices, bought land from Piankeshaw Native American tribes in 1773 and 1775. The plaintiffs were lessees of Thomas Johnson's descendants, who had inherited the land. The defendant, William M'Intosh (pronounced "McIntosh"), subsequently obtained a land patent, according to the facts as Marshall accepted them, to this same land from the United States. In fact, the two parcels did not overlap at all. Further, there is evidence that the parties were aware the tracts did not overlap and purposely misrepresented the facts to the court to obtain a ruling.

Prior history
The plaintiffs brought an action for ejectment against M'Intosh in the United States District Court for the District of Illinois, contending that their chain of title was superior by virtue of Johnson's purchases. The District Court dismissed the claim on the grounds that the Piankeshaw were not able to convey the land.

Opinion
Marshall, writing for a unanimous court, affirmed the dismissal.

Marshall begins with a lengthy discussion of history of the European colonization of the Americas and the legal foundations of the American Colonies. In particular, Marshall focuses on the manner in which each European power took land from the indigenous occupants. Synthesizing the law of colonizing powers, Marshall traces the outlines of the "discovery doctrine"—namely, that a European power gains radical title (also known as sovereignty) to the land it discovers. As a corollary, the "discovering" power gains the exclusive right to extinguish the "right of occupancy" of the Indigenous occupants, which otherwise survived the assumption of sovereignty.

Marshall further opined that when it declared independence from the Crown, the United States government inherited the right of preemption over Native American lands. The legal result is that the only Native American conveyances of land which can create valid title are sales of land to the federal government.

Legacy
Law and economics
At least one commentator has noted that Johnson, by holding that only the federal government could purchase Native American lands, created a system of monopsony, which avoided bidding competition between settlers and thus enabled the acquisition of Native American lands at the lowest possible cost.

Role in law school curriculum
Prof. Stuart Banner at UCLA School of Law, writes of the case:
Johnsons continuing prominence is reinforced every year in law schools, where it is the very first case most beginning students read in their required course in Property. The bestselling property casebook calls Johnson 'the genesis of our subject' because it lays 'the foundations of landownership in the United States.' Given current understandings surrounding Indigenous law, and the role of Native Americans in America, the outcome of the case has come to be viewed with disapproval in law school. Johnson has joined Dred Scott v. Sandford and a few others to form a small canon (or maybe an anti-canon) of famous cases law students are taught to criticize. The leading casebook describes the philosophy underlying Johnson as "discomforting" and quotes with approval the recent view of a law professor that Marshall's opinion "was rooted in a Eurocentric view of the inferiority of the Indian people." Johnson, though, might be the only member of this anti-canon that remains the law, and that is still cited as authority by lower courts several times a year.
In 1998, Matthew Fletcher published a reflection on his experience studying Johnson v. M'Intosh as part of the first-year law curriculum. Fletcher is a member of the Grand Traverse Band of Ottawa and Chippewa Indians and a graduate of the University of Michigan Law School. Blending autobiography, story-telling and poetry, and legal discourse, he portrays the case as fundamental to founding injustices in American society, showing that "you can kill people and destroy what they are and call it legal and fair play" (530).

Notes

Further reading
 Robert Williams, Jr., The American Indian in Western Legal Thought: The Discourses of Conquest (1989).
 Walter Echo-Hawk, In the Courts of the Conqueror: The 10 Worst Indian Law Cases Ever Decided (2010).
 Stuart Banner, How the Indians Lost Their Land: Law and Power on the Frontier (2005).
 Lindsay G. Robertson, Conquest by Law: How the Discovery of America Dispossessed Indigenous Peoples of Their Lands (2005).
 Jean Edward Smith, John Marshall: Definer Of A Nation (1996).
 Michael C. Blumm, Retracing the Discovery Doctrine, Aboriginal Title, Tribal Sovereignty, and Their Significance to Treaty-Making in the United States, 28 Vt. L. Rev. 713 (2004).
 Eric Kades, The Dark Side of Efficiency: Johnson v. M'Intosh and the Expropriation of American Indian Lands, 148 U. Pa. L. Rev. 1065 (2000).
 Eric Kades,  History and Interpretation of the Great Case of Johnson v. M'Intosh, 19 L. & Hist. R. 67 (2001).
 Blake A. Watson Buying America From the Indians: "Johnson v. McIntosh" and the History of Native Land Rights (University of Oklahoma Press; 2012) 494 pages

External links
 
 

1823 in United States case law
Aboriginal title case law in the United States
United States Native American case law
Race and law in the United States
United States Supreme Court cases
United States Supreme Court cases of the Marshall Court
Miami tribe
Indian Territory